Low German or Low Saxon (and other names) is a West Germanic language variety spoken mainly in Northern Germany and the northeastern part of the Netherlands. The dialect of Plautdietsch is also spoken in the Russian Mennonite diaspora worldwide.

Low German is most closely related to Frisian and English, with which it forms the North Sea Germanic group of the West Germanic languages. Like Dutch, it has historically been spoken north of the Benrath and Uerdingen isoglosses, while forms of the High German language (of which Standard German is a standardized example) have historically been spoken south of those lines. Like Frisian, English, Dutch and the North Germanic languages, Low German has not undergone the High German consonant shift, as opposed to Standard High German, which is based on High German dialects. Low German evolved from Old Saxon (Old Low German), which is most closely related to Old Frisian and Old English (Anglo-Saxon).

The Low German dialects spoken in the Netherlands are mostly referred to as Low Saxon, those spoken in northwestern Germany (Lower Saxony, Westphalia, Schleswig-Holstein, Hamburg, Bremen, and Saxony-Anhalt west of the Elbe) as either Low German or Low Saxon, and those spoken in northeastern Germany (Mecklenburg-Western Pomerania, Brandenburg, and Saxony-Anhalt east of the Elbe) mostly as Low German. This is because northwestern Germany and the northeastern Netherlands were the area of settlement of the Saxons (Old Saxony), while Low German spread to northeastern Germany through eastward migration of Low German speakers into areas with a Slavic-speaking population (Germania Slavica).

It has been estimated that Low German has approximately 1.6 million speakers in Germany, primarily Northern Germany, and 2.15 million in the Netherlands.

Geographical extent

Inside Europe

Germany

It has been estimated that Low German has approximately 2 to 5 million speakers (depending on the definition of 'native speaker') in Germany, primarily in Northern Germany.

Variants of Low German are spoken in most parts of Northern Germany, for instance in the states of Lower Saxony, North Rhine-Westphalia, Hamburg, Bremen, Schleswig-Holstein, Mecklenburg-Vorpommern, Saxony-Anhalt, and Brandenburg. Small portions of northern Hesse and northern Thuringia are traditionally Low Saxon-speaking too.
Historically, Low German was also spoken in formerly German parts of Poland as well as in East Prussia and the Baltic provinces (modern Estonia and Latvia). The Baltic Germans spoke a distinct Low German dialect, which has influenced the vocabulary and phonetics of both Estonian and Latvian. The historical Sprachraum of Low German also included contemporary northern Poland, East Prussia (the modern Kaliningrad Oblast of Russia), a part of western Lithuania, and the German communities in Estonia and Latvia, most notably their Hanseatic cities. German speakers in this area fled the Red Army or were forcibly expelled after the border changes at the end of World War II.

The language was also formerly spoken in the outer areas of what is now the city-state of Berlin, but in the course of urbanisation and national centralisation in that city, the language has vanished (the Berlin dialect itself is a northern outpost of High German, though it has some Low German features).

Today, there are still speakers outside Germany to be found in the coastal areas of present-day Poland (minority of ethnic German East Pomeranian speakers who were not expelled from Pomerania, as well as the regions around Braniewo). In the Southern Jutland region of Denmark there may still be some Low German speakers in some German minority communities, but the Low German dialects of Denmark can be considered moribund at this time.

The Netherlands
Dialects of Low German are spoken in the northeastern area of the Netherlands (Dutch Low Saxon) and are written there with an unstandardized orthography based on Standard Dutch orthography. The position of the language is, according to UNESCO, vulnerable. Between 1995 and 2011 the numbers of parent speakers dropped from 34% in 1995 to 15% in 2011. Numbers of child speakers dropped from 8% to 2% in the same period. According to a 2005 study 53% speak Low Saxon or Low Saxon and Dutch at home and 71% could speak it in the researched area. The total number of speakers is estimated at 1.7 million speakers. There are speakers in the Dutch north and eastern provinces of Groningen, Drenthe, Stellingwerf (part of Friesland), Overijssel, Gelderland, Utrecht and Flevoland, in several dialect groups per province.

Outside Europe and the Mennonites

There are also immigrant communities where Low German is spoken in the Western hemisphere, including Canada, the United States, Mexico, Belize, Venezuela, Bolivia, Argentina, Brazil, Paraguay and Uruguay. In some of these countries, the language is part of the Mennonite religion and culture. There are Mennonite communities in Ontario, Saskatchewan, Alberta, British Columbia, Manitoba, Kansas and Minnesota which use Low German in their religious services and communities. These Mennonites are descended from primarily Dutch settlers that had initially settled in the Vistula delta region of Prussia in the 16th and 17th centuries before moving to newly acquired Russian territories in Ukraine in the late 18th and early 19th centuries, and then to the Americas in the 19th and early 20th centuries. The types of Low German spoken in these communities and in the Midwest region of the United States have diverged since emigration. The survival of the language is tenuous in many places, and has died out in many places where assimilation has occurred. Members and friends of the Historical Society of North German Settlements in western New York (Bergholz, New York), a community of Lutherans who trace their immigration from Pomerania in the 1840s, hold quarterly "Plattdeutsch lunch" events, where remaining speakers of the language gather to share and preserve the dialect. Mennonite colonies in Paraguay, Belize, and Chihuahua, Mexico, have made Low German a "co-official language" of the community.

In , nevertheless, Pomeranian Brazilians are more often proud of their language, and particular religious traditions and culture, and not uncommonly inheriting the nationalism of their ancestors, being more likely to accept marriages of its members with Brazilians of origins other than a Germanic Central European one than to assimilate with Brazilians of Swiss, Austrian, Czech, and non-East Pomeranian-speaking German and Prussian heritage – that were much more numerous immigrants to both Brazilian regions (and whose language almost faded out in the latter, due to assimilation and internal migration), by themselves less numerous than the Italian ones (with only Venetian communities in areas of highly Venetian presence conserving Talian, and other Italian languages and dialects fading out elsewhere).

Nomenclature

The language grouping of Low German is referred to, in the language itself as well as in its umbrella languages of German and Dutch, in several different ways, ranging from official names such as Niederdeutsche and Nederduits to more general characterisations such as "dialect". The proliferation of names or characterisations is due in part to the grouping stretching mainly across two different countries and to it being a collection of varieties rather than a standardised language.

There are different uses of the term "Low German":

 A specific name of any West Germanic varieties that neither have taken part in the High German consonant shift nor classify as Low Franconian or Anglo-Frisian; this is the scope discussed in this article.
 A broader term for the closely related, continental West Germanic languages unaffected by the High German consonant shift, nor classifying as Anglo-Frisian, and thus including Low Franconian varieties.

In Danish it is called ,  or, rarely, . Mennonite Low German is called .

"Low" refers to the flat plains and coastal area of the northern European lowlands, contrasted with the mountainous areas of central and southern Germany, Switzerland, and Austria, where High German (Highland German) is spoken. Etymologically however, Platt meant "clear" in the sense of a language the simple people could understand. In Dutch, the word  can also mean "improper", "rude" or "too simple" which is why the term is not popular in the Netherlands.

The colloquial term  denotes both Low German dialects and any non-standard Western variety of German; this use is chiefly found in northern and Western Germany and is not considered to be linguistically correct.

The ISO 639-2 language code for Low German (Low Saxon) has been nds ( or ) since May 2000.

Classification 

Low German is a part of the continental West Germanic dialect continuum. To the West, it blends into the Low Franconian languages, including Dutch. A distinguishing feature between the Southern Low Franconian varieties and Low German varieties is the plural of the verbs. Low German varieties have a common verbal plural ending, whereas Low Franconian varieties have a different form for the second person plural. This is complicated in that in most Low Franconian varieties, including standard Dutch, the original second-person plural form has replaced the singular. Some dialects, including again standard Dutch, innovated a new second-person plural form in the last few centuries, using the other plural forms as the source.

To the South, Low German blends into the High German dialects of Central German that have been affected by the High German consonant shift. The division is usually drawn at the Benrath line that traces the  –  isogloss.

To the East, it abuts the Kashubian language (the only remnant of the Pomeranian language) and, since the expulsion of nearly all Germans from the Polish part of Pomerania following the Second World War, also by the Polish language. 
East Pomeranian and Central Pomeranian are dialects of Low German.

To the North and Northwest, it abuts the Danish and the Frisian languages. Note that in Germany, Low German has replaced the Danish and Frisian languages in many regions. Saterland Frisian is the only remnant of East Frisian language and is surrounded by Low German, as are the few remaining North Frisian varieties, and the Low German dialects of those regions have influences from Frisian substrates.

Most linguists classify the dialects of Low German together with English and Frisian as the North Sea Germanic or Ingvaeonic languages.

Language or dialect 
The question of whether today's Low German should be considered a separate language or a dialect of German or even Dutch has been a point of contention. Linguistics offers no simple, generally accepted criterion to decide the question.

Scholarly arguments have been put forward for classifying Low German as a German dialect. As stated above, the arguments are not linguistic but rather sociopolitical and revolve mainly around the fact that Low German has no official standard form or use in sophisticated media. The situation of Low German may thus be considered a "pseudo-dialectized abstand language" (""). In contrast, Old Saxon and Middle Low German are generally considered separate languages in their own right. Since Low German has strongly declined since the 18th century, the perceived similarities with High German or Dutch may often be direct adaptations from the dominating standard language, resulting in a growing inability by speakers to speak correctly what was once Low German proper.

Others have argued for the independence of today's Low German dialects, taken as continuous outflow of the Old Saxon and Middle Low German tradition. Glottolog classifies six varieties of Low German as distinct languages based on a low degree of mutual intelligibility. Eastern Low German and Plautdietsch are classified as part of Greater East Low German, while Eastphalian, Westphalic, and the North Low Saxon languages, German Northern Low Saxon and Gronings, are classified as part of West Low German.

Legal status 
Low German has been recognized by the Netherlands and by Germany (since 1999) as a regional language according to the European Charter for Regional or Minority Languages. Within the official terminology defined in the charter, this status would not be available to a dialect of an official language (as per article 1a), and hence not to Low German in Germany if it were considered a dialect of German. Advocates of the promotion of Low German have expressed considerable hope that this political development will at once lend legitimacy to their claim that Low German is a separate language, and help mitigate the functional limits of the language that may still be cited as objective criteria for a mere dialect (such as the virtually complete absence from legal and administrative contexts, schools, the media, etc.).

At the request of Schleswig-Holstein, the German government has declared Low German as a regional language. German offices in Schleswig-Holstein are obliged to accept and handle applications in Low German on the same footing as Standard High German applications. The  ruled in a case that this was even to be done at the patent office in Munich, in a non–Low German region, when the applicant then had to pay the charge for a translator, because applications in Low German are considered not to be written in the German language.

Varieties of Low German

 Low Saxon or West Low German
 East Frisian Low Saxon
 Northern Low Saxon
 Holsteinian (Holsteinisch)
 Schleswigian (Schleswigsch)
 Dithmarsch (Dithmarsisch)
 North Hanoverian (Nordhannoversch)
 Emslandish (Emsländisch)
 Oldenburgish (Oldenburgisch)
 Gronings and Noord-Drents
 Hogelandsters
 Oldambtsters
 Stadsgronings
 Veenkoloniaals
 Westerkwartiers
 Kollumerpompsters
 Kollumerlands
 Middaglands
 Midden-Westerkwartiers
 Zuid-Westerkwartiers
 Westerwolds
 Westphalian
 Westmünsterländisch
 Münsterländisch
 South Westphalian
 East Westphalian
 Stellingwerfs
 Drents
 Midden-Drents
 Zuid-Drents
 Twents
 Twents-Graafschaps
 Twents
 Gelders-Overijssels
 Achterhoeks
 Sallands
 Oost-Veluws (partly classified as Veluws)
 Urkers
 Veluws
 Oost-Veluws (partly classified as Gelders-Overijssels)
 West-Veluws
 Eastphalian
 East Low German
 
 
 Central Pomeranian
 East Pomeranian
 Low Prussian
  (Mennonite Low German, used also in many other countries)

History

Old Saxon

Old Saxon, also known as Old Low German, is a West Germanic language. It is documented from the 9th century until the 12th century, when it evolved into Middle Low German. It was spoken on the north-west coast of Germany by Saxon peoples. It is closely related to Old Anglo-Frisian (Old Frisian, Old English),  partially participating in the Ingvaeonic nasal spirant law.

Only a few texts survive, predominantly in baptismal vows the Saxons were required to perform at the behest of Charlemagne. The only literary texts preserved are Heliand and the Old Saxon Genesis.

Middle Low German

The Middle Low German language is an ancestor of modern Low German. It was spoken from about 1100 to 1600. The neighbouring languages within the dialect continuum of the West Germanic languages were Middle Dutch in the West and Middle High German in the South, later substituted by Early New High German. Middle Low German was the lingua franca of the Hanseatic League, spoken all around the North Sea and the Baltic Sea. It had a significant influence on the Scandinavian languages and other languages around the Baltic Sea. Based on the language of Lübeck, a standardized written language was developing, though it was never codified.

Contemporary
There is a distinction between the German and the Dutch Low Saxon/Low German situation.

Germany
After mass education in Germany in the 19th and 20th centuries, the slow decline which Low German had been experiencing since the end of the Hanseatic League turned into a free fall. The decision to exclude Low German in formal education was not without controversy, however. On one hand, proponents of Low German advocated that since it had a strong cultural and historical value and was the native language of students in northern Germany, it had a place in the classroom. On the other hand, High German was considered the language of education, science, and national unity, and since schools promoted these values, High German was seen as the best candidate for the language of instruction.

Initially, regional languages and dialects were thought to limit the intellectual ability of their speakers. When historical linguists illustrated the archaic character of certain features and constructions of Low German, this was seen as a sign of its "backwardness." It was not until the efforts of proponents such as Klaus Groth that this impression changed. Groth's publications demonstrated that Low German was a valuable language in its own right, and he was able to convince others that Low German was suitable for literary arts and was a national treasure worth keeping.

Through the works of advocates like Groth, both proponents and opponents of Low German in formal education saw the language's innate value as the cultural and historical language of northern Germany. Nevertheless, opponents claimed that it should simply remain a spoken and informal language to be used on the street and in the home, but not in formal schooling. In their opinion, it simply did not match the nationally unifying power of High German. As a result, while Low German literature was deemed worthy of being taught in school, High German was chosen as the language of scholarly instruction. With High German the language of education and Low German the language of the home and daily life, a stable diglossia developed in Northern Germany. Various Low German dialects are understood by 10 million people, but many fewer are native speakers. Total users of Low German (nds) are approximately 2.5 million, with 300,000 native speakers in Brazil and 1,000 in Germany as of 2016.

The KDE project supports Low German (nds) as a language for its computer desktop environment, as does the GNOME Desktop Project. Open-source software has been translated into Low German; this used to be coordinated via a page on SourceForge, but as of 2015, the most active project is that of KDE.

Netherlands
In the early 20th century, scholars in the Netherlands argued that speaking dialects hindered language acquisition, and it was therefore strongly discouraged. As education improved, and mass communication became more widespread, the Low Saxon dialects further declined, although decline has been greater in urban centres of the Low Saxon regions. When in 1975 dialect folk and rock bands such as Normaal and  became successful with their overt disapproval of what they experienced as "misplaced Dutch snobbery" and the Western Dutch contempt for (speakers of) Low Saxon dialects, they gained a following among the more rurally oriented inhabitants, launching Low Saxon as a sub-culture.
Nonetheless, the position of the language is vulnerable according to UNESCO.  Low Saxon is still spoken more widely than in Northern Germany. Efforts are made in Germany and in the Netherlands to protect Low German as a regional language.

Sound change
Therefore, a lot of Low German words sound similar to their English counterparts. One feature that does distinguish Low German from English generally is final devoicing of obstruents, as exemplified by the words 'good' and 'wind' below. This is a characteristic of Dutch and German as well and involves positional neutralization of voicing contrast in the coda position for obstruents (i.e. t = d at the end of a syllable.) This is not used in English except in the Yorkshire dialect, where there is a process known as Yorkshire assimilation.

For instance: water , later , bit , dish , ship , pull , good , clock , sail , he , storm , wind , grass , hold , old .

The table below shows the relationship between Low German consonants which were unaffected by this chain shift and their equivalents in other West Germanic languages. Contemporary Swedish and Icelandic shown for comparison; Eastern and Western North Germanic languages, respectively.

Notes:
* High German  is a loanword from Low German
** The series –, etc. are cognates, not semantic equivalents. The meanings of some of these words have shifted over time. No cognate to  /  /  has survived in English (compare Old English  "lady"; the English word frow "woman, lady" rather being a borrowing of the Middle Dutch word).
*** Pronounced shepp since the 17th century

Grammar

Generally speaking, Low German grammar shows similarities with the grammars of Dutch, Frisian, English, and Scots, but the dialects of Northern Germany share some features (especially lexical and syntactic features) with German dialects.

Verbs
In Low German verbs are conjugated for person, number, and tense. There are five tenses in Low German: present tense, preterite, perfect, and pluperfect, and in Mennonite Low German the present perfect which signifies a remaining effect from a past finished action. For example, "", "I am come", means that the speaker came and he is still at the place to which he came as a result of his completed action.

Unlike Dutch, High German, and southern Low German, the northern dialects form the past participle without the prefix ge-, like the Scandinavian languages, Frisian and English. Compare northern Low German  to the German past participle . This past participle is used with the auxiliary verbs hewwen/hebben "to have" and wesen/sin/sien "to be". When the past participle ends with -en or in a few oft-used words like west (been).

There is also a progressive form of verbs in present, corresponding to the same in the Dutch language.
It is formed with wesen (to be), the preposition an (at) and dat (the/it).

 1 Instead of wesen, sien (to be) Saxon uses doon (to do) to make to present continuous.
 2 Many see the n as an old dative ending of dat which only occurs when being shortened after prepositions. This is actually the most frequently-used form in colloquial Low German.
 3 This form is archaic and mostly unknown to Low German speakers. It is the same pattern as in the English example "I am making." The present participle has the same form as the infinitive: maken is either "to make" or "making".

Adjectives 
The forms of Low German's adjectives are distinct from other closely related languages such as German and English. These forms fall somewhere in between these two languages. As in German, the adjectives in Low German may make a distinction between singular and plural to agree with the nouns that they modify, as well as between the three genders, between the nominative and oblique cases and between indefinite (weak) and definite (strong) forms. However, there is a lot of variation in that respect and some or all of these distinctions may also be absent, so that a single undeclined form of the adjective can occur in all cases, as in English. This is especially common in the neuter. If the adjective is declined, the pattern tends to be as follows:

As mentioned above, alternative undeclined forms such as dat lütt Land, de lütt Lannen, en stark Kerl, de stark Kerl, stark Kerls, de stark Kerls etc. can occur.

Phonology

Consonants

The sound [] can occur as an allophone of // among dialects.
// and // can have allophones as [] and [].
// can be articulated as uvular [] among Northern dialects and younger speakers.
 The sound // can also be realized as fricative or affricate sounds [~~], [], in word-initial position.

Vowels

 [] and [] can occur as allophones of // and //.
Vowel backness of // to [] may also occur among dialects.

 [] can be heard as an allophone of // within diphthongs.
Long phonemes //, //, //, occur mostly in the Geest dialects, while in other dialects, they may be realized as diphthongs.

Writing system
Low German is written using the Latin alphabet. There is no official standard orthography, though there are several locally more or less accepted orthographic guidelines. Those in the Netherlands are mostly based on Dutch orthography and may vary per dialect region, and those in Germany mostly follow German orthography. To the latter group belongs the orthography devised by Johannes Sass. It is mostly used by modern official publications and internet sites, especially the Low German Wikipedia. This diversity, a result of centuries of official neglect and suppression, has a very fragmenting and thus weakening effect on the language as a whole, since it has created barriers that do not exist on the spoken level.  Interregional and international communication is severely hampered by this. Most of these systems aim at representing the phonetic (allophonic) output rather than underlying (phonemic) representations. An alternative spelling based on etymology was the Algemeyne Schryvwyse developed by Reinhard Franz Hahn, which was designed mostly with Northern Low German dialects in mind. In 2020, a group of Dutch and German Low German Wikipedians took Hahn's principles and used them to create the Nysassiske Skryvwyse (New Saxon Orthography), which is aimed to cover all dialects on both sides of the Dutch-German border. That being as it may, many writers follow guidelines only roughly. This adds numerous idiosyncratic and often inconsistent ways of spelling to the already existing great orthographic diversity.

Notable Low German writers and performers
 Heinrich Bandlow
 Hans-Friedrich Blunck
 John Brinckmann
 De fofftig Penns
 Gorch Fock
 Friedrich Wilhelm Grimme (Westphalian: Sauerländisch)
 Klaus Groth (Dithmarsisch)
 August Hermann
 Joachim Mähl
 Johann Meyer (Dithmarsisch)
 Martha Müller-Grählert
 Fritz Reuter (Mecklenburgisch-Vorpommersch)
 Willem Schröder
 Julius Stinde
 Rudolf Tarnow
 Augustin Wibbelt (Westphalian: Münsterländisch)
 Wilhelm Wieben
 Hans-Jürgen Massaquoi
 Normaal
 Daniël Lohues

Middle Low German authors:
 Eggerik Beninga
 Balthasar Russow
 Albert Suho

Plautdietsch authors:
 Arnold Dyck
 Reuben Epp
 Jack Thiessen

See also
 1614 Low German Bible
 Bible translations into German
 Friar Rush
 Hamborger Veermaster
 The Juniper Tree (fairy tale)
 Meuse-Rhenish
 Moin
 Ohnsorg-Theater
 Masurian dialect

Notes

References

Bibliography

External links

 http://www.plattmaster.de/
 http://www.platt-online.de/
 http://www.niederdeutschzentrum.de/
 https://www.deutsch-plattdeutsch.de/

Online dictionaries
 Plattmakers dictionary with more than 20,000 word entries, with translations and interface available in several languages (English too)
 Dictionary of the Drents dialect (Dutch)
 Mennonite Low German-English Dictionary

Information
 Nu is de Welt platt! International resources in and about Low German
 Building Blocks of Low Saxon (Low German), an introductory grammar in English and German
 Niederdeutsch/Plattdeutsch in Westfalen, by Olaf Bordasch
 Mönsterlänner Plat, by Klaus-Werner Kahl
 Plattdeutsch heute

Organisations
 IJsselacademie (Overijssel and Veluwe, the Netherlands)
 Staring Instituut (Achterhoek, the Netherlands)
 Stichting Stellingwarver Schrieversronte (Friesland, the Netherlands)
 SONT (General, the Netherlands)

 Oostfreeske Taal (Eastern Friesland, Germany)
 Diesel - dat oostfreeske Bladdje (Eastern Friesland, Germany)
 Institut für niederdeutsche Sprache e.V. (General, Germany)

 
Languages of Germany
West Germanic languages
German dialects
Dutch dialects
Danish dialects
North Sea Germanic